His/Her Worship the Mayor of North Sydney is the head of North Sydney Council, which is the local government area in the lower north shore region of Sydney including North Sydney, Neutral Bay, Cremorne and Crows Nest in the State of New South Wales, Australia. From 1983 to 2017, the Mayor was directly elected, replacing the previous system of being internally elected annually by the Councillors, nominally serving a four-year term. Following a constitutional referendum in 2017, the Mayor is now elected for a two-year term by the elected Councillors, effective from the 2021 elections, and the office is currently held by Zoë Baker since 10 January 2022. The Mayor is assisted in their work by a Deputy Mayor, who is elected on an annual basis by the elected Councillors.

History
The area now covered by North Sydney Council originally comprised three municipalities: the Borough of East St Leonards from 1860 (Kirribilli, Cremorne Point, Milsons Point), the Borough of St Leonards from 1867 (Cammeray, Mosman, Waverton, Wollstonecraft) and the very small Borough of Victoria from 1871 (McMahons Point and parts of North Sydney and Lavender Bay). These boroughs lasted until 29 July 1890 when they merged to form the "Borough of North Sydney", with the last Mayor of St Leonards, Francis Punch, elected as the first Mayor of North Sydney. Following a petition submitted by residents in 1892, on 11 April 1893 the Mossman Ward of North Sydney confirmed its separation as the Borough of Mosman, being proclaimed by Lieutenant-Governor Sir Frederick Darley. From 28 December 1906, following the passing of the Local Government Act, 1906, the council was renamed as the "Municipality of North Sydney". With the passing of the Local Government Act, 1993, the Municipality of North Sydney became North Sydney Council and aldermen were renamed councillors.

A referendum passed at the 2017 election also altered the system of electing the mayor. Starting in 2020, the mayor will be elected by the councillors from among their members for a two-year term. As the wording of this referendum did not specify a reduction in the number of elected positions in the Council (such as from 10 Councillors to 9), the Office of Local Government required Council to specify a ward structure of equal numbers to each ward: two wards of five councillors or five wards of two councillors. At its extraordinary meeting held on 20 January 2020, the Council voted to adopt a two-ward model on a north/south boundary with the northern ward named "St Leonards Ward" and the southern ward named "Cammeraygal Ward" from the next election. Although the fixed term of the Council is four years, due to delays caused by amalgamations and the COVID-19 pandemic, the term from 9 September 2017 expired on 3 December 2021.

List of incumbents

The following individuals has served as the Mayor of North Sydney Council, or any predecessor titles:

Deputy Mayors
The position of Deputy Mayor was made a permanent council position when the Local Government Act 1919 came into effect from 1 January 1920. However, the position was optional and was not filled until August 1926, when during a period of illness of the sitting mayor, Charles Watt, the Council resolved to fill the position permanently, and a former mayor, Edward Clark, was elected as the first Deputy Mayor. The following individuals have been elected as Deputy Mayor of North Sydney:

Notes

References

External links

 
Mayors of North Sydney
North Sydney
Mayors North Sydney